Ludwig Bölkow (30 June 1912 – 25 July 2003) was one of the aeronautical pioneers of Germany.

Background
Born in Schwerin, in then north-central Germany, in 1912, Bölkow was the son of a foreman employed by Fokker, one of the leading aircraft constructors of that time.

Early career
Bölkow's first job was with Heinkel, the aircraft company, before studying aero-engineering at the Technical University in Berlin. On graduation, in 1939, he joined the project office of Messerschmitt AG in Augsburg, where he served initially as a clerk, later as a group leader for high-speed aerodynamics, especially for the Messerschmitt Me 262 and its successors. In January 1943, he was appointed head of the Messerschmitt Bf 109 development office in Vienna. A year later, Bölkow returned to the Messerschmitt project office, which had meanwhile moved to Oberammergau. There he set up a program for the development of the Messerschmitt P.1101 jet fighter.

Later career
After the war he created the Bölkow GmbH in Ottobrunn, which with time grew to the biggest aeronautics and spaceflight company, MBB (Messerschmitt-Bölkow-Blohm). In the early 1990s it was bought by DASA.

He carried out the construction of the first German satellite, Azur, launched in 1969.

Bölkow was awarded the Ludwig-Prandtl-Ring from the Deutsche Gesellschaft für Luft- und Raumfahrt (German Society for Aeronautics and Astronautics) for "outstanding contribution in the field of aerospace engineering" in 1972. He was awarded a Gold Medal by the British Royal Aeronautical Society in 1978.

See also
Messerschmitt Me 262
Messerschmitt

References

1912 births
2003 deaths
Grand Crosses 1st class of the Order of Merit of the Federal Republic of Germany
German aerospace engineers
German aerospace businesspeople
German company founders
Ludwig-Prandtl-Ring recipients
Messerschmitt Me 262
People from Schwerin
Werner von Siemens Ring laureates
Engineers from Mecklenburg-Western Pomerania